The 2017 IPONE German FIM Speedway Grand Prix was the ninth race of the 2017 Speedway Grand Prix season. It took place on September 9 at the Bergring Arena in Teterow, Germany.

Riders 
First reserve Peter Kildemand replaced Greg Hancock, second reserve Martin Smolinski replaced Nicki Pedersen and third reserve Max Fricke replaced Niels-Kristian Iversen. The Speedway Grand Prix Commission also nominated Kai Huckenbeck as the wild card, and Tobias Kroner and Mathias Bartz both as Track Reserves.

Results 
The Grand Prix was won by Slovenia's Matej Žagar, who beat Martin Vaculík, Jason Doyle and Chris Holder in the final. Doyle had initially top scored in the qualifying heats, however the third place saw him move 10 points clear of Patryk Dudek, who was eliminated in the semi-finals.

Heat details

Intermediate classification

References

See also 
 Motorcycle speedway

Germany
Speedway Grand Prix
2017 in German sport
Speedway Grand Prix of Germany